Fatuma Ibrahim Ali is a Kenyan politician. She has been a Commissioner of the Kenya National Commission on Human Rights. Ali was a Member of the 11th Session of the Kenyan Parliament representing the Wajir County. She was elected to the position in March 2013 on an Orange Democratic Movement ticket. She is currently a member of the 4th Assembly (2017- 2022), of the East African Legislative Assembly representing Kenya. She is of Somali ethnicity.

References

Living people
Ethnic Somali people
Kenyan people of Somali descent
Members of the 11th Parliament of Kenya
Members of the East African Legislative Assembly
21st-century Kenyan women politicians
21st-century Kenyan politicians
Year of birth missing (living people)